What's Wright? with Nick Wright (sometimes capitalized What's Wright? With Nick Wright) is an American sports podcast and YouTube series. Hosted by sportscaster Nick Wright and co-hosted by his son Damonza Byrd, the series premiered on March 15, 2022.

Development and history
Prior to signing with Fox Sports 1 (FS1) and hosting First Things First (FTF), Nick Wright was the host of What's Wright with Nick Wright?, a radio show on the Kansas City-based 610 Sports station. After departing the station, Wright relocated to Houston, while continuing to work in sports radio, before working on television for FS1. 

From 2018 to 2020, Wright hosted another incarnation of his What's Wright with Nick Wright? radio show, this time on Sirius XM's Mad Dog Radio station.

In January 2022, Fox Sports launched Fox Audio Network, a podcast network to leverage its on-air talent in the audio space. Originally scheduled to premiere on March 1, 2022, Wright's podcast ultimately premiered on March 15. The podcast is produced by Blue Duck Media.

After Wright's podcast debuted, it held the #4 ranking on the Apple Podcasts chart.

Format
Wright co-hosts the podcast with his son, Damonza Byrd. Wright's podcast episodes originally aired on Tuesdays. Episodes discussing general sports stories now air on Monday and Thursday, with sports betting-related episodes airing on Fridays.

On regular episodes of the podcasts, Wright and Byrd discuss general trending sports topics. The NBA and NFL are often highlighted during the series, although Wright and Byrd have discussed tennis, golf, and college sports topics.

Wright has also hosted "special" episodes of the podcast, including his countdown "Top 50 NBA of the Last 50 Years", as well as an interview with Lil Wayne.

References

2018 radio programme debuts
2020 radio programme endings
2022 podcast debuts
Audio podcasts
Fox Sports original programming
Sirius XM Radio programs
Sports podcasts
Video podcasts
YouTube channels launched in 2022